Section 1 of the Constitution Act, 1867 is a provision of the Constitution of Canada, setting out the title to the Act.

The Constitution Act, 1867 is the constitutional statute which established Canada.  Originally named the British North America Act, 1867, the Act continues to be the foundational statute for the Constitution of Canada, although it has been amended many times since 1867.  It is now recognised as part of the supreme law of Canada.

Constitution Act, 1867

The Constitution Act, 1867 is part of the Constitution of Canada and thus part of the supreme law of Canada.  It was the product of extensive negotiations by the governments of the British North American provinces in the 1860s. The Act sets out the constitutional framework of Canada, including the structure of the federal government and the powers of the federal government and the provinces.  Originally enacted in 1867 by the British Parliament under the name the British North America Act, 1867, in 1982 the Act was brought under full Canadian control through the Patriation of the Constitution, and was renamed the Constitution Act, 1867.  Since Patriation the Act can only be amended in Canada, under the amending formula set out in the Constitution Act, 1982.

Text of section 1 

Section 1 reads:

Section 1 is found in Part I of the Constitution Act, 1867, dealing with preliminary matters.

Amendments

Section 1 has been amended once since the Act was enacted in 1867.  The original name of the Act was the British North America Act, 1867.  It was changed to its current name on the Patriation of the Constitution in 1982.

Purpose and interpretation
The original name, the British North America Act, 1867, reflected the colonial origins of the statute, enacted by the British Parliament in the mid-19th century, when the colonies of British North America were part of the British Empire.  It was changed to Constitution Act, 1867, as part of the Patriation process, to modernise and rationalise the Constitution of Canada, without reference to British links.

The short title of a statute is generally used for citing the statute, rather than the longer full title.  The long title is sometimes used by a court as an aid to interpretation.  Both titles are equally authoritative.

Related provisions
The formal long title of the Act is:  An Act for the Union of Canada, Nova Scotia, and New Brunswick, and the Government thereof; and for Purposes connected therewith.

References 

Constitution of Canada
Canadian Confederation
Federalism in Canada